Harry Sørensen may refer to:

 Harry Sorensen (basketball) (1914–1991), American professional basketball player
 Harry Sørensen (canoeist) (1946–2015), Danish sprint canoer
 Harry Sørensen (gymnast) (1892–1963), Danish gymnast